Mary Ziegler is an American legal historian. She is the Martin Luther King Jr. Professor of law at the University of California, Davis School of Law.

Early life and education 
Ziegler was born in 1982 and grew up in Montana. She graduated from Phillips Academy Andover in 2000 and Harvard College in 2004, where she published short stories in the Harvard Advocate and taught English as a second language to refugee students through the Refugee Summer Youth Enrichment program. Ziegler then earned her JD from Harvard Law School in 2007. She lives in California with her husband and daughter.

Career

Law 
After graduating from law school, Ziegler clerked for Justice John Dooley of the Vermont Supreme Court before completing a Ruebhausen postgraduate fellowship at Yale Law School. She began work as an assistant professor at the Saint Louis University School of Law in 2010 before joining the faculty at Florida State University College of Law in 2013. She was a visiting professor at Harvard Law School in spring 2022 and joined the law faculty at UC Davis in the fall of 2022.

Author 
Ziegler is the author of five books on the history of abortion in the United States. Her first, After Roe: The Lost History of the Abortion Debate, won the Thomas J. Wilson Memorial Prize for best first manuscript in any discipline from Harvard University Press and was reviewed in The Economist. Her second book, Beyond Abortion: Roe v. Wade and the Fight for Privacy, was published by Harvard University Press in 2018 and was reviewed in The New York Review of Books. Her third book, Abortion and the Law in America: Roe v. Wade to the Present, was published by Cambridge University Press in 2020 and was reviewed in The Christian Science Monitor and The Washington Post.

In 2022, Ziegler published a reference book titled Reproduction and the Constitution in the United States with Routledge Press. Her most recent book, Dollars for Life: The Anti-Abortion Movement and the Fall of the Republican Establishment was published by Yale University Press in June 2022 and was reviewed in The New York Times. Kirkus Reviews called the book a "sober, knowledgeable scholarly analysis of a timely issue.”

Public engagement 
Ziegler has written on the legal history of abortion in the United States for The Atlantic, CNN, The New York Times, and The Washington Post. She also regularly comments on related topics for ABC News, The New Yorker, NPR, and PBS NewsHour. Pulitzer Prize winner David Garrow has called her "the premier historian of abortion in the post-Roe era."

Bibliography 
 After Roe: The Lost History of the Abortion Debate (2015)
 Beyond Abortion: Roe v. Wade and the Battle for Privacy (2018)
 Abortion and the Law in America: Roe v. Wade to the Present (2020)
 Reproduction and the Constitution in the United States (2022)
 Dollars for Life: The Anti-Abortion Movement and the Fall of the Republican Establishment (2022)
 Roe: The History of a National Obsession (2023)

References

External links 

 
 Faculty profile at UC Davis

Saint Louis University School of Law faculty
Florida State University faculty
Harvard College alumni
Harvard Law School alumni
Harvard Advocate alumni
Living people
Legal historians
Historians from Montana
Phillips Academy alumni
American women historians
21st-century American historians
1982 births